The Burlington Breakwater is a breakwater providing shelter to the harbor of Burlington, Vermont from the open waters of Lake Champlain.  It was built in several stages between 1836 and 1890, and is a rare example of a 19th-century timber-cribbed stone breakwater.  It was listed on the National Register of Historic Places in 2003.

Description and history
The harbor of Burlington, Vermont is located near the center of Burlington Bay, which extends from Appletree Point in the north to Shelburne Point in the south. Set off from the city's port area, the Burlington Breakwater shelters that area from the broad waters of Lake Champlain to west. The structure has seven legs laid out in a zig-zag pattern, laid out to roughly follow the contour of the shoreline. Its visible portions are covered by a variety of stone materials. Its underwater structure consists of timber cribs, most laid on a rubble foundation, that are filled with rubblestone. The cribs are hemlock at the lower levels and white pine at the upper levels, and are joined by notched corners. Most of the upper levels of the cribbing have been replaced by stone because of subsequent rotting. The lake-facing side of the breakwater was largely faced in riprap in 1961. The ends of the breakwater are marked by modern lights.

It was built as part of a program by the federal War Department to improve shelter for the major port facilities on Lake Champlain.

Near the breakwater's southern end lies the shipwrecked General Butler, which struck the breakwater during a storm in 1876 and sank, its passengers and crew reaching safety on the breakwater before she sank.  It is now a popular dive site.

See also
National Register of Historic Places listings in Chittenden County, Vermont

References

National Register of Historic Places in Burlington, Vermont
Infrastructure completed in 1836
Breakwaters
Geography of Burlington, Vermont
Lake Champlain
1836 establishments in Vermont